Fresh International Market  is a Chinese–American, pan-Asian, and international supermarket chain operated out of Raleigh, North Carolina. The chain, with locations throughout the Midwest and Southeast, also owns several other Asian supermarkets under different names, such as Green Onion, which it acquired in 2016, and (formerly) Oriental Mart, which was rebranded under the Fresh International Market label in 2021. Fresh International Market is also looking to expand its footprint into the Northeast via a 2021 proposal to the Urban Redevelopment Authority of Pittsburgh to operate a store at the site of a former Shop 'n Save supermarket in Pittsburgh's Hill District.

History
The chain began in 2012, in the college town of East Lansing, Michigan, near the campus of Michigan State University. At the time, Michigan State enrolled the highest number of Chinese international students in the United States, with roughly 4,700 Chinese citizens enrolled over the period of a Brookings Institution study on foreign student visa approvals. Founder Bowen Kou, himself a former Chinese international student, began his studies at MSU in 2009 and became a grocery entrepreneur after being rejected for a job in the campus cafeteria. 

Kou was initially co-owner of a student bookstore and a cafe in East Lansing, Michigan before he decided to focus on the grocery industry through the acquisition of two mid-Michigan Asian supermarkets, which formed the origin of the Fresh International Market brand and acted as a springboard for Midwest expansion.

References

2012 establishments in Michigan
Food manufacturers of the United States
Chinese-American culture
Retail companies established in 2012
Supermarkets of the United States